Northern Code (also written as The Northern Code) is a 1925 American silent Northern romantic drama film directed by Leon De La Mothe and starring Robert Ellis, Eva Novak, and Josef Swickard.

Plot
As described in a film magazine review, drunken Raoul La Fane, a Canadian trapper, attacks his young wife Marie. She fires a revolver at him and he falls. Fearing arrest for murder, Marie flees into the snow wilderness. Louis Le Blanc aids her and, after she finds that he truly loves her and supposing her brutal husband dead, she weds him. Later, Raoul appears, and Marie tells Louis her secret. Louis follows Raoul and, in the fight that follows, Raoul dies after falling over a cliff. Louis returns to Marie and informs her that there is no longer any bar to their future happiness.

Cast

References

Bibliography
 Connelly, Robert B. The Silents: Silent Feature Films, 1910-36, Volume 40, Issue 2. December Press, 1998.
 Munden, Kenneth White. The American Film Institute Catalog of Motion Pictures Produced in the United States, Part 1. University of California Press, 1997.

External links
 
 Lobby card at www.gettyimages.com

1925 films
1920s English-language films
American silent feature films
Films directed by Leon De La Mothe
American black-and-white films
Gotham Pictures films
Northern (genre) films
1920s American films